Konomala is an Oceanic language spoken on New Ireland in Papua New Guinea. Much of the population has shifted to Siar-Lak.

References

Languages of New Ireland Province
St George linkage